Infest (originally stylised as InFest) is an annual three-day music festival held at the University of Bradford Union in the United Kingdom, featuring alternative electronic music acts, from genres including industrial, EBM, futurepop, synth-pop and power noise. The event usually takes place on the August bank holiday weekend.

History

Background
InFest was born in early 1998 through the efforts of three students of the University of Bradford – Gareth 'Gadge' Harvey, Chris 'Crusty' Molyneux, and Max 'Maxi Slag' – and the Students' Union Entertainments Manager, Floyd Peltier. The concept of the festival was originally envisioned as a one-day event for local goth bands in West Yorkshire, but the crew were able to also onboard much bigger acts, such as gothic/death rock band Alien Sex Fiend. The student organisers were already fans of the Whitby Gothic Weekend and took the idea for Infest to the Whitby festival-goers and traders to gauge how popular the show might be. The response was positive and the first Infest festival was confirmed as 14 and 15 August 1998.

The following year (1999), the festival paid more attention towards the electronic side of the goth and industrial scene by booking Apoptygma Berzerk for their first UK show.

Reinvention
By 2000, the University of Bradford's Students' Union felt that they could not carry the costs of the festival any longer. However, an independent goth/industrial promoter and DJ named Mark 'Gus' Guy (former drummer with the indie band Kerosene), who had been advising Molyneux during the show's early years, stepped in to fill the void. As a result of the heavy involvement with Guy and his Terminal Productions company, Infest took the form it is recognised as today: the festival's theme has moved from goth/industrial crossover to alternative electronic, with a greater emphasis on power noise, futurepop, synth-pop and electronic body music. However, occasionally more Dark wave-style goth bands do still appear on the line-up.

The stylisation of the name had changed in 2003 to be "Infest", and from this time has grown significant international recognition. The show continues to provide a market for traders, which helps to bring the music and the lifestyle of the show's fans together. There is also a full festival program where nightclubs, DJs, bands and businesses can make their voices heard. Infest has been supported by a number of electronic record labels, notably Ant-Zen, Hands Productions, now-defunct online music store Music Non Stop, Storming the Base (part of the record label Artoffact Records). Support outside the scene has also come from software publisher Ableton, and drink manufacturers Jägermeister and Barr.

In July 2013, the festival organisers announced that "it is highly unlikely that there will be an Infest in 2014"; but following "an avalanche of messages of support" the organisers have decided to "throw caution to the wind and go ahead with Infest in 2014 (The reason for announcing that infest 2014 was highly unlikely was due to AltFest being proposed to occur a couple of weeks before Infest in 2014. In the end Altfest was canceled due to lack of ticket sales and financial insecurity for the viability of a new big festival that had no history on the alternative music scene)."

Today
Today, Guy has a small team of people at his side, including Molyneux (the remaining member of the founding team), graphic designer Richard King, Ticket Office Manager Lee Thornton and a crew of volunteers and live production professionals.

The festival celebrated their 20th anniversary in 2018, adding an extra day that year for the occasion.

Performers

1998
 Alien Sex Fiend, Dust to Dust, Horatii, Leechwoman, man(i)kin, Nekromantik, Passion Play, Rosetta Stone (cancelled), Sneaky Bat Machine, Squid, Ultraviolence

1999
 Friday: The DJ Wars: The Bratcave DJs Vs Deathstar Disco
 Saturday: Apoptygma Berzerk, Faithful Dawn, Killing Miranda, Sneaky Bat Machine, man(i)kin
 Sunday: Spahn Ranch, Inertia, Narcissus Pool

2000
 Friday: Ultraviolence, Synapscape
 Saturday: VNV Nation, Manuskript, MS Gentur, Intra Venus, Project X, Void Construct
 Sunday: In Strict Confidence, Dream Disciples, Imminent, man(i)kin, Libitina

2001
 Friday: Inertia, The Nine, Swarf, 
 Saturday: Suicide Commando, Beborn Beton, P.A.L, Leechwoman, Katscan, Illumina, 
 Sunday: Covenant, Dive, Icon of Coil, Monolith, Goteki

2002
 Friday: XPQ-21, Psyche, Revolution by Night
 Saturday: Funker Vogt, Sonar, S.P.O.C.K (replacing Neuroticfish), Winterkälte, Greenhaus, Synthetic
 Sunday: Mesh, Noisex, Welle: Erdball, Asche, Aslan Faction

2003
 Friday: cut.rate.box, scrap.edx, Tarantella Serpentine
 Saturday: God Module, Needle Sharing, Seabound, Tarmvred, Culture Kultür, Je$us Loves Amerika, SINA (cancelled)
 Sunday: VNV Nation, Hypnoskull, [:SITD:], Resurrection Eve, Arkam Asylum

2004
 Friday: Lights of Euphoria, Ah Cama-Sotz, Action Directe
 Saturday: Suicide Commando, Proyecto Mirage, Plastic, Combichrist, Angel Theory, Skinflick
 Sunday: Assemblage 23, Converter, Spetsnaz, Mono No Aware (replacing Sara Noxx), Silence Is Sexy

2005
 Friday: Fixmer/McCarthy, Powderpussy, Univaque
 Saturday: Covenant, Punch Inc, Decoded Feedback, HIV+, The Azoic, Tin Omen
 Sunday: Blutengel, KiEw, Iris, Final Selection, Deviant UK

2006
 Friday  Lab 4, Destroid, Schmoof
 Saturday Rotersand, Architect, Unter Null, Reaper, S.K.E.T., O.V.N.I
 Sunday Front Line Assembly, Wai Pi Wai, Stromkern, Frozen Plasma, Autoclav1.1

2007
 Friday  Portion Control, Greyhound, The Gothsicles.
 Saturday  Apoptygma Berzerk, 13th Monkey, Dope Stars Inc., Caustic, Faderhead, Synnack.
 Sunday VNV Nation, Soman, Painbastard, Rupesh Cartel, E.S.A.

2008
 Friday  Grendel, Snog, Coreline.
 Saturday  And One, 5F-X, Heimataerde, Santa Hates You, 100blumen, Skinjob.
 Sunday Front 242, Noisuf-X, Tyske Ludder, Marsheaux, Deviant UK.

2009
 none

2010
 Friday  De/Vision, Heimstatt Yipotash, Mandro1d.
 Saturday  Rotersand, x-Rx, Agonoize, Memmaker, Northern Kind
 Sunday Project Pitchfork, Nachtmahr, Ayria, Patenbrigade: Wolff, Concrete Lung, Parralox (postponed from Saturday).

2011
 Friday  Uturns, Code 64, Tactical Sekt.
 Saturday  V2A, Maschinenkrieger 52 vs Disraptor, Alien Vampires, Absolute Body Control, Xotox, Hocico
 Sunday Sci-Fi Mafia (added during the weekend), Analog Angel, Julien K (cancelled), Shiv-R, mind.in.a.box, Sonar, VNV Nation

2012
 Friday  Spacebuoy, Dirty K, Necro Facility, Klinik
 Saturday  System:FX, Suono, A Split-Second, XP8, Geistform, Solitary Experiments, DJ Kohl
 Sunday Resist, Tenek, Blitzmaschine, Absurd Minds, Winterkälte, Suicide Commando

2013
 Friday  Metal Tech, Inertia, Dive, Pride & Fall
 Saturday  AAAK, Wieloryb, Click Click, Da Octopusss, Chrysalide, Imperative Reaction, DJ Kohl
 Sunday Autoclav1.1, Future Trail, XMH, Sono, Cervello Elettronico, Covenant

2014
 Friday  Dreams Divide, Cyanotic, Acucrack, Haujobb
 Saturday  The Ladder, Be My Enemy, Xenturion Prime, Architect (replacing Ambassador21), Legend, Juno Reactor
 Sunday  Syd.31, Mr.Kitty, ESA (replacing Le Moderniste), Solar Fake, Ashbury Heights, VNV Nation (replacing Project Pitchfork)

2015
 Friday  Ctrl Alt Del, D-K-A-G, Cocksure, Empirion
 Saturday  Alterred, Ethan Fawkes, Chant, L'Âme Immortelle, Klangstabil, mind.in.a.box
 Sunday  Mechanical Cabaret, reADJUST, Bhambhamhara, Syrian (replacing Melotron), Monolith, Project Pitchfork

2016
 Friday  Pop Will Eat Itself, Dead When I Found Her, Me The Tiger, Massive Ego
 Saturday  Atari Teenage Riot, Velvet Acid Christ, Grausame Töchter, Hysteresis, Monica Jeffries, Tapewyrm
 Sunday  3Teeth, Leaether Strip, Displacer, Rroyce, Vigilante, Johnny Normal

2017
 Friday  Rotersand, Noyce, Accessory, They Called Him Zone
 Saturday  Die Krupps, End.User, Wulfband, Empathy Test, Chemical Sweet Kid, Riotmiloo
 Sunday  Revolting Cocks, iVardensphere, The Juggernauts, Vampyre Anvil, Sidewalks and Skeletons, Among the Echoes

2018
An extra day (Thursday) was added to celebrate the 20th anniversary of the event.
 Thursday Peter Hook and the Light, Empirion, Zeitgeist Zero, Grave Diggers Union
 Friday Cubanate, Iszoloscope, Siva Six, Def Neon
 Saturday Mesh, Sarin, Liebknecht, Actors, Yura Yura, Adam is a girl, Flesh Eating Foundation
 Sunday Aesthetic Perfection, This Morn Omina, Strvngers, Elegant Machinery, Valhall, Massenhysterie, Promenade Cinema

2019
 Thursday Warm Up Party featuring Das Ich, Inertia, Black Light Ascension, Drakenwerks, Matt Hart. 
 Friday Light Asylum, Sulpher, Torul, Bitman
 Saturday Zardonic, She Wants Revenge, Dive, Rave the Reqviem, Cacophoneuses, Landscape Body Machine, Witch of the Vale.
 Sunday Ancient Methods, Nitzer Ebb, Kaelan Mikla, OHMelectronic, Future Lied to Us, Noire Antidote, Ded.Pxl, Karkasaurus

2020
Due to Covid-19 the show was moved online and called Stay-In-Fest. 

Three online stages were hosted by Lee Chaos, Duracell Bunny, Kark & Peewee ([Karkasaurus), and Matt Biomechanimal.

2021
A small crowd of around 80 people were invited to a social distanced show held live in Bradford. This was again streamed out as Stay-In-Fest 2021.

Friday had a small warmup party featuring Biomechanimal (DJ set), Karkasaurus and Chaos Emergency Doof Broadcast.
 Saturday live at the venue Red Meat, Bone Cult, Tapewrym, Portion Control, Tapewrym, Biomechanimal, DSTR, NOISOME

2022

See also
List of electronic music festivals
List of gothic festivals
List of industrial music festivals

References

External links

Official Infest Homepage
BBC report on Infest 2008
BBC report on Infest 2007
BBC report on Infest 2006
BBC report on Infest 2004
Flickr Infest Photo Group

Industrial music
Industrial music festivals
Electronic body music
Goth festivals
Music festivals in West Yorkshire
Goth subculture
1998 establishments in England
Music in Bradford
Electronic music festivals in the United Kingdom
Music festivals established in 1998